The Calexico West Port of Entry (formerly known simply as the Calexico Port of Entry, and sometimes called the "Downtown" port of entry) is one of two ports of entry in the Imperial Valley area of California. It is located in the business center of the Calexico-Mexicali metropolitan area that is divided by an international boundary.  This crossing has easy access north to Interstate 8 via California State Route 111. Mexican Federal Highway 5 then begins its journey to the south.  The General Services Administration is currently implementing a multi-year facility upgrade that will dramatically change the appearance and throughput of the border crossing.

History

There has been a border crossing at Calexico since the late 19th century.  The area grew substantially when irrigation converted the barren Imperial Valley into fertile agricultural land.  Irrigation happened as a direct result of a huge flood (combined with topsoil) in 1906 when the Colorado River burst its channel due to the California Development Company's poor engineering.  Enter George Chaffey and his Imperial Land Company who solved the flood problem and laid out the towns of Calexico, El Centro, Imperial (among others) and in Mexico...  Mexicali.  So with his work he was allowed to name the valley as the Imperial Valley.

The historic border inspection station on Heffernan Avenue was built in 1933. It was listed on the U.S. National Register of Historic Places in 1992, and remains today as US government office space.  In 1974, a new port of entry was built two blocks to the west, adjacent to the international rail crossing.

References

External links
Calexico West Port of Entry at the General Services Administration

See also

 List of Mexico–United States border crossings
 List of Canada–United States border crossings

Mexico–United States border crossings
Ports of Entry in Mexicali–Imperial
Calexico, California
Mexicali
Transportation buildings and structures in Imperial County, California
National Register of Historic Places in Imperial County, California
Government buildings on the National Register of Historic Places in California
1902 establishments in California
Buildings and structures completed in 1902